The Mountain of Smoke is a hill in the Southern Governorate of Bahrain. The Mountain of Smoke is named as such because of the haze which often surrounds it on humid days. A number of caves of indeterminate type are in the vicinity of the mountain.

Flint dating to the Stone Age has been found on and around the hill.

See also 
 Geography of Bahrain
 List of tourist attractions in Bahrain

References 

Tourism in Bahrain
Dukhan
Highest points of countries